Meduma is a community in the Kwabre East Municipality of the Ashanti Region of Ghana. The Nsutaman Rural Bank has a branch in Meduma.

References 

Ashanti Region
Communities in Ghana